Yoshio Tezuka (born 14 September 1966) is a Japanese politician from the Constitutional Democratic Party who was elected to the House of Representatives in the Tokyo 5th district in the 2021 Japanese general election.

References 

Living people
1966 births
Members of the House of Representatives from Tokyo
21st-century Japanese politicians

Constitutional Democratic Party of Japan politicians